AUP may refer to:

Educational institutions
 Adventist University of the Philippines
 American University of Paris
 American University Preparatory School

University presses
 Amsterdam University Press
 Associated University Presses, US

Other uses
 Acceptable use policy, in business
 Agile Unified Process, in programming
 Airspace Use Plan, an airspace management message
 Average Unit Price, a business concept given discounts and revenue share
 Australian pound, a defunct currency